Woodburn was a stone-built railway station with substantial goods sidings in Northumberland, on the Wansbeck Railway between Morpeth and Reedsmouth. It served the villages of West and East Woodburn plus a local military camp.

History

Due to financial difficulties the line was built in stages. At this time the Wansbeck Railway Company amalgamates with the North British Railway. It was only on 1 May 1865 that the line was completed. In 1923 the line and the North British Railway merged with the London and North Eastern Railway.

The station was opened in 1865. In September 1952 passenger services were withdrawn from the line, and the goods service from much of the line in November 1963. The line was closed completely in the October 1966 with the station being closed on 3 October 1966. The station building and platform remain as a private residence.

References

External links
Woodburn Station on Northumbrian Railways
Woodburn Station on a navigable 1956 O. S. map
The line on RailScot

Disused railway stations in Northumberland
Former North British Railway stations
Railway stations in Great Britain opened in 1865
Railway stations in Great Britain closed in 1952
1865 establishments in England